Ralph Buren Taylor (January 26, 1874 – February 23, 1958) was an American archer. He competed in the men's double York round and the men's double American round at the 1904 Summer Olympics.

References

External links
 

1874 births
1958 deaths
Olympic archers of the United States
American male archers
Archers at the 1904 Summer Olympics
19th-century American physicians
20th-century American physicians
People from Franklin County, Ohio
Physicians from Ohio
Sportspeople from Ohio